William Moore is a former Scottish international lawn bowler.

Bowls career
He won a silver medal in the fours at the 1962 British Empire and Commonwealth Games in Perth with Thomas Hamill, Joseph Black and Michael Purdon.

He also won the Scottish National Bowls Championships fours title in 1960 and the pairs title with Jimmy McIntyre in 1969.

References

Date of birth unknown
Scottish male bowls players
Commonwealth Games silver medallists for Scotland
Bowls players at the 1962 British Empire and Commonwealth Games
Commonwealth Games medallists in lawn bowls
Medallists at the 1962 British Empire and Commonwealth Games